Alexander "Sasha" Farber is an Australian-American professional dancer, known for his appearances as a pro and troupe member on Dancing with the Stars.

Personal life
Farber was born in Belarus, Soviet Union but moved to Australia in 1986. His family is Jewish. He began dancing at the age of 13. When he was 17, Farber won the Australian Youth Latin Championships twice and represented Australia at the World Latin Championships. He was also featured in the 2000 Sydney Olympic Games closing ceremony and featured in the second season of the Australian Dancing with the Stars. He was also an original cast member of Broadway production of Burn the Floor. He dated fellow Dancing with the Stars member Emma Slater from 2011 to 2014. In December 2015, Farber made a post on his Instagram account confirming that he and Slater were back together. On October 4, 2016, Farber proposed to Slater during a broadcast of Dancing with the Stars after performing a dance together. The two are now married as of March 25, 2018.
In 2020 he has gained American citizenship. In 2022 he and Emma separated and in February 2023 Emma, filed for divorce.

Professional career

Dancing with the Stars
Farber began appearing in season fourteen as a troupe member. However he was promoted to professional dancer in season 17 when he was paired with Jersey Shore cast member Nicole "Snooki" Polizzi. The pair were eliminated in week 7 despite good scores and praise from the judges. He was placed back in the troupe for the next four seasons. On March 8, 2016, Farber was again announced as a pro for season 22 and paired with actress Kim Fields. The couple was eliminated on May 2, 2016, along with Von Miller and Witney Carson, tying for 7th place. Farber returned for season 23 and was partnered with Little Women: LA star Terra Jolé. Jolé and Farber were eliminated on week 10 of the competition, finishing in 5th place despite tying for the top of the leaderboard, marking Farber's first time in the Semifinals. He returned for season 24 and was partnered with Olympic artistic gymnast Simone Biles. The couple was shockingly eliminated one week before the finals on May 15, 2017, after receiving two perfect scores and praise from the judges. For season 25, he returned as a member of the troupe. He appeared as a pro again in season 26 and was paired with former Olympic figure skater Tonya Harding. The pair made it to the finals and finished in third place overall, marking Farber's first appearance in the finale. For season 27, he was partnered with former Olympic gymnast Mary Lou Retton. The couple was eliminated on week 6 of competition, finishing in 9th place. Farber also did a junior version of the show mentoring Scottie Pippen’s daughter Sophia Pippen and pro Jake Monreal. They got out on week 3. He returned again for season 28 where he was paired with Fifth Harmony singer Ally Brooke. Faber once again made it to finals with Brooke and finished in third place for the second time. For season 29, he was partnered with One Day at a Time actress Justina Machado. They reached the finals and finished in 4th place. For season 30, he was partnered with Olympic gymnast Suni Lee. They reached the semifinals and finished in 5th place. For season 31, he was partnered actress Selma Blair. On October 17, 2022, Blair and Farber were forced to withdraw from the competition due to Blair’s ongoing health condition with Multiple Sclerosis finishing in 12th place.

With Nicole "Snooki" Polizzi
Placed: 8th; (average: 25.0)

1 Score given by guest judge Julianne Hough.

With Kim Fields
Placed: 8th; (average: 22.9)

1 Score given by guest judge Zendaya.2 For this week only, as part of "America's Switch Up", Fields performed with Keo Motsepe instead of Farber. Farber performed with Paige VanZant.3 Score given by guest judge Maksim Chmerkovskiy.

With Terra Jolé
Placed: 5th; (average: 33.9)1Score given by guest judge Pitbull2Score given by guest judge Idina Menzel

With Simone Biles
Placed: 4th; (average: 35.6)

1 Score given by guest judge Nick Carter.2 Score given by guest judge Mandy Moore.

With Tonya Harding
Placed: 3rd; (average: 25.2)

1 Score given by guest judge Rashad Jennings.  2 Score given by guest judge David Ross.

With Mary Lou Retton
Placed: 9th; (average: 23.1)

With Ally Brooke
Placed: 3rd; (average: 26.6)

1 Score given by guest judge Leah Remini.  2 Score given by guest judge Joey Fatone.

With Justina Machado
Placed: 4th; (average: 25.5)

With Suni Lee
Placed: 5th; (average: 33.8)

With Selma Blair
Placed: 12th; (average: 31.2)

References

Living people
Australian male dancers
Australian choreographers
American male dancers
American choreographers